"Little Fluffy Clouds" is a single released by the British ambient house group the Orb. It was originally released in November 1990 on the record label Big Life and peaked at number 87 on the UK Singles Chart. The Orb also included it on their 1991 double album The Orb's Adventures Beyond the Ultraworld. "Little Fluffy Clouds" was re-released several times with different B-sides, with its 1993 re-release reaching number 10 in the UK.

It ranked number 275 in NMEs list of The 500 Greatest Songs of All Time. Pitchfork Media ranked it at number 40 on their list of the Top 200 Tracks of the 1990s.

Production
Alex Paterson had previously worked with Jimmy Cauty as the Orb. Upon Cauty's departure from the Orb, Paterson began work on "Little Fluffy Clouds" with ex-Killing Joke member Martin "Youth" Glover. However, because of other production obligations, Glover did not become a permanent member of the Orb. Kris "Thrash" Weston joined the Orb soon after. Weston mixed and engineered several versions of "Little Fluffy Clouds", including the version on The Orb's Adventures Beyond the Ultraworld.

Samples

"Little Fluffy Clouds" makes extensive use of clips from an interview with American singer Rickie Lee Jones in which she recalls picturesque images of her childhood. The samples are widely believed to have come from a conversation between Jones and LeVar Burton on the children's television program Reading Rainbow, but in fact originated from an interview disc that was issued with some promotional boxed copies of her album Flying Cowboys. The interview was not conducted by Burton. The interviewer is not identified on the recording or in the boxed set's liner notes, though a 1993 profile in The Independent identifies him as "an American DJ" with a "syrupy, Simon Bates-style tone."

Interviewer: "What were the skies like when you were young?"

Jones: "They went on forever – They - When I w- We lived in Arizona, and the skies always had little fluffy clouds in 'em, and, uh... they were long... and clear and... there were lots of stars at night. And, uh, when it would rain, it would all turn - it- They were beautiful, the most beautiful skies as a matter of fact. Um, the sunsets were purple and red and yellow and on fire, and the clouds would catch the colours everywhere. That's uh, neat 'cause I used to look at them all the time, when I was little. You don't see that. You might still see them in the desert."

Jones' record company was upset at the unauthorized use of her voice and initially sought to pursue a claim via the legal system. Big Life chose to settle out of court for an undisclosed sum of money for use of her voice on the Orb's recording: in 2016, Paterson said the record company paid $5,000 to use the sample. Asked about the sample in an interview years later, Jones referred to the Orb as "those fuckers."

The song also uses a harmonica sample from Ennio Morricone's The Man With The Harmonica (from the film Once Upon a Time in the West) and parts of Electric Counterpoint, a piece for multi-tracked guitars composed by Steve Reich and recorded by Pat Metheny. According to Glover, the inspiration for the track came when an Orb fan who worked in a Birmingham record shop sent him a tape with Electric Counterpoint on one side and the Rickie Lee Jones interview on the other. Reich was "genuinely flattered" by the Orb's use of his work and instructed his record company not to sue. Despite this, the Orb did receive a letter from Reich's lawyers several years later, but Paterson described Reich as "a proper gentleman: he wanted 20% from then on and asked us to do a remix of one of his tunes, which we did".  Alex Paterson also suggested that the drum track is sampled: "If anyone actually knew where the drums on 'Little Fluffy Clouds' came from, they'd all just die, but I'm not at liberty to tell. Record companies have always warned me, 'Don't tell anyone where you got your samples until we get them cleared!'". He later said that the drum track was sampled from Harry Nilsson's album Nilsson Schmilsson, and others have specifically identified this as a sample of Jim Gordon's drum solo from "Jump Into the Fire", slowed down approximately from 45 to 33 rpm. The use of a slowed-down "Jump Into the Fire" was acknowledged by Paterson in a 2016 interview with The Guardian, in which he also said the track included a Lee "Scratch" Perry sample.

In 2006 a previously uncredited sample from "Little Fluffy Clouds" was recognised by MTV label director Dan Waite, who identified the first voice heard on the song as that of his cousin John Waite. A 1990 John Waite BBC Radio 4 broadcast for the programme You and Yours was sampled and features at the beginning of the track. John Waite can clearly be heard saying, "Over the past few years, to the traditional sounds of an English summer, the drone of lawnmowers, the smack of leather on willow, has been added a new noise...". In 2013, the Orb's management asked John Waite to join them on their 25th Anniversary tour to read the classic line live on stage.

Commercial reception
"Little Fluffy Clouds" reached number 87 on the UK Singles Chart and was a dancefloor success. After the popularity of following Orb albums, "Little Fluffy Clouds" was re-released several times, including a 1993 edition which peaked at number 10 on the UK chart.

Track listings7-inch: Big Life / BLR 33 (UK) "Little Fluffy Clouds [seven inch mk 1]" (4:05)
 "Little Fluffy Clounds [ambient mk 1]" (4:29)12-inch: Big Life / BLR 33T (UK) "Little Fluffy Clouds [dance mk 2]" (8:26)
 "Into the Fourth Dimension [edit]" (7:03)
 "Little Fluffy Clounds [ambient mk 1]" (4:29)12-inch: Big Life / BLR 33R (UK) "Little Fluffy Clouds (drum & vox version)" (7:10)
 "Little Fluffy Clouds [seven inch mk 1]" (4:05)
 "Into the Fourth Extension" (9:05)CD: Big Life / BLRD 98 (UK) "Little Fluffy Clouds [seven inch mk 1]" (4:05)
 "Little Fluffy Clouds [dance mk 2]" (8:26)
 "Into the Fourth Dimension [edit]" (7:03)
 "Little Fluffy Clounds [ambient mk 1]" (4:29)12-inch: Mercury / 865139-1 (US) "Little Fluffy Clouds [Cumulonimbus Mix]" (6:10)
 "Little Fluffy Clouds [Dis joint don't argue mix]" (6:38)
 "Little Fluffy Clouds [Seven Inch MK 1]" (4:05)
 "Little Fluffy Clouds [Inner Master Mix]" (3:58)
 "Outlands [Fountain of Elisha]" (8:00)CD: Mercury / 865139-2 (US)'
 "Little Fluffy Clouds [Seven Inch MK 1]" (4:05)
 "Little Fluffy Clouds [Inner Master Mix]" (3:58)
 "Little Fluffy Clouds [Cumulonimbus Mix]" (6:10)
 "Little Fluffy Clouds [Dance MK 2]" (8:26)
 "Little Fluffy Clouds [Heavyweight Dub]" (6:30)
 "Outlands [Fountain of Elisha]" (8:00)

Charts

References

1990 singles
The Orb songs
1990 songs
Songs written by Youth (musician)
Big Life Records singles